Double line may refer to:

 Double track, a type of railway involving running a track in each direction
 Double line automatic signalling, a form of railway signalling used on the majority of double track sections in New Zealand
 Double-lined mackerel, Grammatorcynus bilineatus, a species of Spanish mackerel
 Double-lined spectroscopic binary, a type of binary star: see Binary star#Spectroscopic binaries
 Mythimna turca, common name the double line, a moth of the family Noctuidae
 In algebraic geometry, a certain family of conics
 In algebraic geometry, a singular line of multiplicity 2—a type of double curve